Hindu High School, situated in the heart of karwar, is one of the oldest school in India. It was founded by Vaman Mangesh Dubhashi. 

The school was established in 1897. The school has both English and Kannada medium.

Hindu High School has an NCC unit which is part of 8(Kar) Naval Unit NCC, Karwar.

Former headmasters
 P. S. Bandekar
 N. T. Devadig
 M. B. Naik
 A. D. Kulkarni
 V. S. Shet
 S. D. Bhende
 A. K. Rao
 R. S. Hedge
 P. G. Naik
 Nehan Abdulla

References
 Hindu High School, Karwar

High schools and secondary schools in Karnataka
Schools in Uttara Kannada district
Education in Karwar
Educational institutions established in 1897
1897 establishments in India